Medobory Nature Reserve is a protected nature reserve of Ukraine located in the Podolian Upland in the western part of the country.  It protects a representative portion of the "Tovtry" region, known for rocky limestone ridges. The reserve is in Chortkiv and Ternopil Raions of Ternopil Oblast.

Topography
The reserve occupies a section of the Tovtry region, a 200 km long limestone ridge that formed as a reef in a warm Miocene sea some 15-20 million years ago.  The ridge is highly desiccated and eroded, rising 60–100 meters above the surrounding territory.  The southwestern slopes of the ridge is steep, the northeastern slope gradually flattens.  The highest point in the reserve is Mount Bogit (414 meters).  The Zbruch River runs along the eastern edge of the reserve.

Climate and ecoregion
The climate of the Medobory area is Humid continental climate, warm summer (Köppen climate classification (Dfb)). Precipitation averages 620 mm/year.

Medobory is located in the Central European mixed forests ecoregion, a temperate hardwood forest covering much of northeastern Europe, from Germany to Russia.

Flora and fauna
93% of the reserve is forested, mostly in oak-hornbeam, oak-hornbeam-ash, and oak-beech stands.  The soils are loam and limestone, supporting a wide variety of plants.  Over 1,000 species of vascular plants have been recorded in the area.

Public use
As a strict nature reserve, Medobory's primary purpose is protection of nature and scientific study.  Public access is limited: mass recreation and construction of facilities is prohibited as are hunting and fishing.  The public may access a limited number of ecological trail under supervision of reserve staff.

See also
 Lists of Nature Preserves of Ukraine (class Ia protected areas)
 National Parks of Ukraine (class II protected areas)

References

External links

 Boundaries of Medobory Nature Reserve on OpenStreetMap.org

Protected areas of Ukraine
Nature reserves in Ukraine